Hynhamia micruncus is a species of moth of the family Tortricidae. It is found in Ecuador.

The wingspan is about 23 mm. The ground colour of the forewings is pale ferruginous, mixed with cream in the posterior area of the wing. There are ferruginous brown suffusions and darker dots. The markings are diffuse brown. The hindwings are brown.

Etymology
The species name refers to the comparable small uncus of the species and is derived from Greek micros (meaning small).

References

Moths described in 2007
Hynhamia